Nikolina Vujadin (born 3 November 1995) is a Bosnia and Herzegovina footballer who plays as a midfielder for Ženska Premijer Liga BiH club ZFK Lokomotiva Brčko and the Bosnia and Herzegovina women's national team.

References

1995 births
Living people
Women's association football midfielders
Bosnia and Herzegovina women's footballers
Bosnia and Herzegovina women's international footballers